Hijos del Monte (translated: Del Monte Sons) is a Chilean telenovela produced by TVN. It was written by Víctor Carrasco and directed by María Eugenia Rencoret. Filming began on June 18, 2008 and took place in the Santiago neighborhoods of Padre Hurtado and Isla de Maipo beside the TVN studios.

Two adaptations of this soap have been aired in 2011 and 2022.

Plot
The series tells the story of the five del Monte brothers (from oldest to youngest): Juan, José, Pedro, Gaspar, and Lucas. The five men were all adopted by Emilio del Monte and his wife, Clarisa. Clarisa died from cancer a few years earlier and Emilio dies of a heart attack just before the series begins. The close-knit family live an easygoing life on their ranch. The Del Monte brothers' lives are abruptly changed with the arrival of their father's illegitimate daughter, Paula del Monte. Emilio left a portion of his estate to Paula, who wants to claim what is rightfully hers.

Paula and her mother, Sofía Cañadas, immediately cause disharmony among the brothers. Juan is upset but respects his fathers wishes, José does not want to share their inheritance, Pedro is indifferent to Paula, Gaspar is furious over his father's affair, while Lucas is the only one who fully accepts Paula into the family. There is an instant attraction between Juan and Paula, despite the fact that Juan is engaged to Julieta Millán. While Julieta's heart belongs to Juan, she also shares a connection with Pedro, who is madly in love with her. José has been having an affair with Beatriz Pereira, who is married to Efraín Mardones. It is revealed that José is the father Beatriz's son, Simón. Gaspar is in love with Lupe Mardones, who he has to sneak around with since her father, Eleuterio, disapproves of their relationship. Lucas flirts with Rosario, Julieta's sister, but also develops feelings for Paula.

Juan moves up his wedding to Julieta after they find out she is pregnant. Paula begs Juan not to marry Julieta and they sleep together. Pedro shows Julieta footage of Paula and Juan sleeping together, but she still goes through with the wedding. Sadly, Julieta suffers a miscarriage and she leaves Juan when she realizes he is in love with Paula. Julieta begins seeing Pedro and Juan begins seeing with Paula, but there is tension between the four. Eventually, Juan and Julieta reconcile.

Gustavo Valdés, an attorney of the Del Monte family, gets into a plane crash and tells José just before he dies that he is actually Paula's biological father. Jose blackmails Sofía with this information, saying he will not tell Paula if he gets a portion of her inheritance.

Cast

Main cast

Recurring cast

External links
Official web site

2008 Chilean television series debuts
2009 Chilean television series endings
2008 telenovelas
Chilean telenovelas
Televisión Nacional de Chile telenovelas
Spanish-language telenovelas